Vinifuni Ligerz–Prêles is a funicular above Lake Biel in the Canton of Bern, Switzerland. The line leads from Ligerz/Gléresse at 437 m to Prêles at 820 m on Tessenberg, a plateau part of the Jura range. The line has a length of 1198 m with a difference of elevation of 383 m and a maximum incline of 40%. The single track funicular has had only one car since 2004, when the passing loop and the second car were removed. Two intermediate stations are Pilgerweg at 487 m and Festi/Château at 577 m. The lower station is next to Ligerz railway station and a landing stage for Lake Biel passenger ships. 

The line opened in 1910 after the Swiss Federal Assembly granted a concession in 1906. 

The funicular is owned and operated by Aare Seeland mobil AG since 2003. The railway company had absorbed Ligerz-Tessenberg-Bahn AG (LTB), founded in 1910 and initially named Chemin de fer funiculaire Gléresse-Montagne de Diesse.

Further reading

Notes

See also 
 List of funicular railways
 List of funiculars in Switzerland

References  

de:Ligerz-Tessenberg-Bahn
fr:Funiculaire Gléresse-Prêles

Metre gauge railways in Switzerland
Ligerz-Preles
Transport in the canton of Bern
Railway lines opened in 1912